Pedro Domingos is a Professor Emeritus of computer science and engineering at the University of Washington. He is a researcher in machine learning known for Markov logic network enabling uncertain inference.

Education
Domingos received an undergraduate degree and Master of Science degree from Instituto Superior Técnico (IST). He moved to the University of California, Irvine, where he received a Master of Science degree and followed by PhD.

Research and career
After spending two years as an assistant professor at IST, he joined the University of Washington as an Assistant Professor of Computer Science and Engineering in 1999 and became a full professor in 2012. He started a machine learning research group at the hedge fund D. E. Shaw & Co. in 2018, but left in 2019.

Publications
 2015: The Master Algorithm
 2015: (with Abram Friesen). Recursive Decomposition for Nonconvex Optimization. IJCAI 2015   Distinguished Paper Award.
 2011: (with  Hoifung Poon). Sum-Product Networks: A New Deep Architecture. UAI 2011 Best Paper Award..
 2009: (with  Hoifung Poon). Unsupervised Semantic Parsing. EMNLP 2009 Best Paper Award.
2006: (with Matthew Richardson). Markov logic networks. 
 2005: (with  Parag Singla). Object Identification with Attribute-Mediated Dependences. PKDD 2005 Best Paper Award.
 1999: MetaCost: A General Method for Making Classifiers Cost-Sensitive. SIGKDD 1999 Best Paper Award for Fundamental Research.
 1998: Occam's Two Razors: The Sharp and the Blunt. SIGKDD 1998 Best Paper Award for Fundamental Research.

Awards and honors
 2014: ACM SIGKDD Innovation Award. for his foundational research in data stream analysis, cost-sensitive classification, adversarial learning, and Markov logic networks, as well as applications in viral marketing and information integration.
 2010: Elected an Association for the Advancement of Artificial Intelligence (AAAI) Fellow. For significant contributions to the field of machine learning and to the unification of first-order logic and probability.
 2003: Sloan Fellowship
 1992-1997:Fulbright Scholarship

References

University of Washington faculty
University of California, Irvine alumni
Instituto Superior Técnico alumni
Technical University of Lisbon alumni
Sloan Research Fellows
Artificial intelligence researchers
Computer scientists
Machine learning researchers
Living people
Fellows of the Association for the Advancement of Artificial Intelligence
Year of birth missing (living people)